United Nations Security Council resolution 518, adopted unanimously on 12 August 1982, after recalling resolutions 508 (1982), 509 (1982), 512 (1982), 513 (1982), 515 (1982), 516 (1982) and 517 (1982), the council again demanded that Israel and all other parties strictly observe the resolutions of the Security Council placed on them.

Resolution 518 continued by demanding the immediate lifting of all restrictions on the city of Beirut to permit free entry to humanitarian assistance. The resolution then requested the secretary-general to report back on the implementation of Resolution 518 as soon as possible.

See also
 1982 Lebanon War
 Blue Line
 Green Line, Beirut
 Israeli–Lebanese conflict
 List of United Nations Security Council Resolutions 501 to 600 (1982–1987)
 Siege of Beirut

References
Text of the Resolution at undocs.org

External links
 

 0518
Israeli–Lebanese conflict
 0518
1982 in Israel
1982 in Lebanon
 0518
August 1982 events